Colonial Creek Falls is the tallest waterfall in the continental United States.

According to the World Waterfall Database, it is the tallest waterfall in the continental United States, and is the 15th tallest in the world, exceeding the more renowned Yosemite Falls in height by 143 feet.

See also
List of waterfalls by height

References 

Waterfalls of Whatcom County, Washington
North Cascades National Park
Waterfalls of Washington (state)